The Institute for Election Systems Development (IESD) is an organization founded in 1999 to promote democracy in Russia.

History

IESD was founded in 1999 as the International Foundation for Electoral Systems withdrew from Russia. IESD inherited both the programs started by IFES and IFES's Election Resource Center, a group of references created to support the Central Election Commission of Russia.

Mission

According to their website IESD:

promotes democracy in Russia by providing technical assistance and comprehensive and objective information to all participants of the election process.
strives to enhance the public trust for democracy as the basis of the civil society.

In achieve these goals they, according to their website:

Disseminate information about elections to ensure that the election process is transparent.
Educate participants of the election process on the basic, generally acknowledged principles of election campaign ethics, elections per se, and subsequent responsibilities elected deputies have with respect to their voters.

Activities

References

Book Sources
  Found at Google Books

Think tanks based in Russia